Acquanegra sul Chiese is a comune (municipality) in the Province of Mantua in the Italian region Lombardy, located about  southeast of Milan and about  west of Mantua.

Acquanegra sul Chiese borders the following municipalities: Asola, Bozzolo, Calvatone, Canneto sull'Oglio, Marcaria, Mariana Mantovana, Redondesco.

External links
 Official website